Omorgus candidus is a species of hide beetle in the subfamily Omorginae.

References

candidus
Beetles described in 1872